Protected areas of Azerbaijan include:

State reserves of Azerbaijan (11)
National Parks of Azerbaijan (8)
State Game Reserves of Azerbaijan (24)

Azerbaijan has 9 climate zones and 4,500 higher plant species, 240 of them are endemics and 
"relicts", as well as 140 rare and endangered species. Fauna include 107 mammals, 394 birds, 54 reptiles, 9 amphibians, 14,000 insects and approximately 108 fish species.

The first nature reservesin Azerbaijan were established in the 1930s in Goygol, Zagatala, and Gizilaghaj. The Law on the Protection of the Nature of Azerbaijan was passed in 1969. Seven other specially protected State Nature Reserve sites were added: Shirvan, Basitchay, Garayazi, Aggol, Ismayilli, Ilisu, and Altiaghaj. Total protected areas amount to 10.3% of Azerbaijan's land mass.

There are also 
 biosphere reserves (part of state reserves)
 natural parks
 ecological parks 
 natural monuments
 zoological parks
 botanical and dendrological parks
 sanatoria
 resorts.

See also
Nature of Azerbaijan
Climate of Azerbaijan
Ministry of Ecology and Natural Resources of Azerbaijan Republic

References